B-Sides Collect is a compilation album by Canadian electro-industrial band Skinny Puppy, released in 1999. The album serves as a collection of several B-sides from earlier singles that were out of print by the time of the collection's release. With the exception of "Serpents", this release complements one of the band's earlier compilations, Twelve Inch Anthology.

Not all Skinny Puppy B-sides are represented on this release due to time and label restrictions. Other B-sides that had previously been available but do not appear on this release include: "Censor (Extended Mix)", "Tin Omen (Reload)", "Spasmolytic (Remix)", "Walking On Ice (Live)", "Inquisition (Extended Mix)", and "Choralone (Live)".

Track listing

Personnel 
Skinny Puppy
 Nivek Ogre – vocals
 cEvin Key – synthesizers, guitars, bass guitars, drums
 Dwayne Goettel – synthesizers, sampling

Additional personnel
 Dale Plevin – fretless bass on tracks 9, 16
 Alien Jourgensen – additional guitar on 11, production on 13
 Ken Marshall – mixing on 7, 9, 14, 15
 Adrian Sherwood – production on 1
 Dave Ogilvie – mixing on 9, production on 13
 Greg Reely – mixing on 9
 Marc Ramaer – mixing on 11, 12

References 

B-side compilation albums
1999 compilation albums
Skinny Puppy compilation albums
Nettwerk Records compilation albums